Rank's Green or Ranks Green is a hamlet in the Braintree district, in the county of Essex, England. Other nearby settlements include the town of Braintree and the villages of Great Leighs and Fairstead and the hamlet of Gubbion's Green.

References 
A-Z Essex, 2010 edition. p. 24.

Hamlets in Essex
Braintree District